Fresno Yosemite International Airport  is a joint military/public airport in Fresno, California, United States. It is the primary commercial airport for the San Joaquin Valley and three national parks: Yosemite, Sequoia and Kings Canyon. It offers scheduled passenger flights to several major airline hubs in the United States and international service to Mexico. The facility opened in June 1942 as Hammer Field, a military airfield. The airport is owned and operated by the city of Fresno and operates two runways on a property spanning . Its airport code 'FAT' stands for Fresno Air Terminal, a former name for the airport.

Due to its central location within the state, the airport is home to several military, law enforcement, firefighting, and medical air units. The Fresno Air National Guard Base on the southeast corner of the airport is home to the 144th Fighter Wing of the California Air National Guard. The Fresno Air Attack Base on the eastern side of the airport supports aerial firefighting aircraft. Other government and military operators with facilities at the airport include the California Army National Guard, the California Highway Patrol, the Fresno County Sheriff's Office, and the Fresno Police Department.

Fresno is home to a large operations base for SkyWest Airlines, the nation's largest regional airline.

History

Military beginnings 
The Fresno Yosemite International Airport opened as a military airfield in June 1942, just six months after Japan's attack on Pearl Harbor, leading the United States to enter World War II. The new airfield was named Hammer Field and was used by the United States Army Air Forces as a training facility for the new pilots of the Fourth Air Force. It had a single northwest/southeast oriented runway with a length of 7,200 feet (now runway 11L/29R).

Night fighter training, using Northrop P-61s, was moved to Hammer Field in January 1944, initially with the 481st Night Fighter Operational Training Group, replaced by the 319th Wing in May 1944. Training for the Bell P-59 Airacomet was added to the 319th mission in 1944, as well, confirmed Col. Ralph H. Snavely, commanding officer of the 319th Wing.

At the time, civil and commercial aviation used Chandler Field that had opened in November 1929. Less than a decade after it opened, it was clear that the small runway at Chandler would not be able to accommodate coming larger airliners.

Conversion to civil use 
After World War II, Hammer Field was inactivated by the Army Air Forces and the city of Fresno saw an opportunity to use the site to create a commercial airport much larger than Chandler Field. In 1946 the War Assets Administration reallocated the property to the city, which immediately began construction on a passenger terminal on the northeast side of the airfield. In 1948, the newly renamed Fresno Air Terminal (FAT) opened. Trans World Airlines (TWA) and United Airlines flights to San Francisco/Oakland and Los Angeles moved from Chandler Field to the newly opened airport. Chandler Field was retained by the city of Fresno as a reliever airport and continues to operate as the Fresno Chandler Executive Airport.

Strategic Air Command facilities for Convair B-36 operations were initially proposed for “Hammer Air Force Base”, but objections from the City of Fresno led them to be changed to Travis Air Force Base instead. The Fresno upgrade was projected to cost $22.3 million.

The California Air National Guard moved to the airport in the 1950s and established the Fresno Air National Guard Base on the southeast corner of the property. The guard also built munition storage bunkers along the northern edge of the airport grounds. The 194th Fighter Squadron moved to the facility in late 1954, followed by the 144th Fighter Wing in 1957. As the guard moved in, a second parallel runway (11R/29L) was constructed and opened to traffic in 1956.

Construction started on a new, larger passenger terminal in 1959 on the south side of the field. The building was a long, simple shape that housed a baggage claim area, a central lobby, and a ticketing area. The $1.5 million terminal had long walls of glass for the baggage claim and the ticketing areas, which book-ended the central lobby of solid masonry block which bears a venetian glass mosaic called "Sky and Ground" from Raymond Rice. From the central lobby, passengers used a tunnel to reach the open-air, remote concourse where they boarded planes from ground level. The terminal opened on March 28, 1962 and shortly after received an award from the San Joaquin Valley Chapter of the American Institute of Architects. Although renovated, the original terminal building is still in use today for the same functions that it was designed for. The current air traffic control tower was built around the same time as the terminal and opened in 1961.

Pacific Air Lines was first to schedule jets to Fresno, with Boeing 727-100s in 1966. United was the dominant carrier at the airport throughout the mid-1970s. At the airlines peak, United operated daily DC-8s jet service to Denver, San Francisco and Los Angeles. Hughes Airwest and PSA jets also served the airport at this time.

The first significant expansion to the passenger terminal came in 1978 when a concourse was built straight out from the central lobby. This building, unlike the original remote concourse, was enclosed and climate-controlled.

The airport saw significant down-gauging of flights following airline deregulation in 1978. By 1983, the airport mainly saw turboprop service from smaller carriers and United Airlines ended intrastate flights from Fresno. Delta Air Lines operated mainline jets to Los Angeles, Salt Lake City and Reno in the mid 1990s, but by 1999, the only mainline jet flights remaining at Fresno was the American Airlines service to Dallas/Fort Worth.

In 1996, the airport's name was changed from Fresno Air Terminal to Fresno Yosemite International Airport to attract out-of-state and international visitors to Yosemite National Park to the airport. Despite the new name, scheduled international commercial flights would not begin operating in Fresno for nearly a decade. At the time, airport managers petitioned the FAA for a new identifier code to replace FAT, which they said carries a negative connotation and no longer matched the initials of the airport. The request was denied, with the FAA reaffirming its long-standing policy to only issue a new identifier code when an airport is physically relocated. In recent years, airport managers have embraced the FAT identifier code, naming a major expansion project “FATforward.”

Fresno has been the headquarters for a few airlines throughout its history. In the mid-1980s, Far West Airlines was founded in Fresno and used the airport as a small intrastate hub serving Burbank, Los Angeles, Modesto, Oakland, Orange County, Sacramento, and San Jose. Air 21 was founded in Fresno in January 1994 and operated service between several western cities before ceasing operations in January 1997. Allegiant Air was founded in Fresno in January 1997, and its headquarters were located in the city until it declared bankruptcy in 2000, and the new CEO moved its headquarters to a suburb of Las Vegas.

Expansion and remodeling 

At the turn of the 21st century, the city began a series of projects that would expand and remodel the passenger terminal. The first and most notable project was the expansion of the boarding areas. The project, designed by DMJM Aviation extended the concourse further, creating a new two-level section with six jetbridges. Before this project passengers boarded all planes using stairs or ramps. When completed in 2002, the new concourse building received praise for its design and was named one of the top 10 projects in Fresno Architecture for the decade with critics commending the use of steel and the curved glass facade.

A U.S. Customs and Border Protection facility for international arrivals was added in early 2006, giving federal officials space to check passports and complete customs work. Completion of that facility allowed Fresno to begin receiving scheduled international commercial flights. The first international service started in April 2006 with Mexicana operating flights between Fresno and Mexico City with an intermediate stop in Guadalajara.

With the new concourse extension and new international arrivals facility completed, portions of the original 1960s terminal building were given a major renovation. The project was designed by CSHQA and completed in several phases between 2006 and 2010. While keeping the facility operational, nearly every part of the building was updated including the baggage claim area, security checkpoint, central lobby, ticketing area, and low-level concourse. The centerpiece of the project was “Sequoiascape,” a public art display in the central terminal lobby that depicts life-size, replica sequoia forest, reflecting the airport's role as a gateway to the nearby national parks. The giant trees appear to be supporting the roof of the terminal and are surrounded by fallen logs, and other foliage, surrounded by the split rail fencing and granite curbs that visitors would see at the region’s national parks.

A consolidated rental car facility opened at the airport in 2009. The $22 million project allows customers of most rental car companies to pick up and drop off vehicles just outside the terminal. The project also included the construction of maintenance buildings and storage lots on a nearby, 11-acre site.

Direct international service from Fresno briefly ended in August 2010 when Mexicana went bankrupt. International service resumed, with more flights, less than a year later when both Aeroméxico and Volaris added service between Fresno and Guadalajara in April 2011.

The secondary runway (11R/29L) was widened, lengthened and strengthened in a $30 million project completed in October 2012.

Southwest Airlines began serving the airport on April 25, 2021, the first time the airline provided services at Fresno's airport, with daily flights to Las Vegas and Denver.

The airport added a 917-space, four-level parking garage in November 2021. The project cost US$32 million.

Future expansion 

Fresno Yosemite International Airport is currently working on a US$120 million expansion project that will make several changes to the terminal, including the addition of a new concourse building with two new gates that can be used for both domestic and international flights, enlarging the screening area for arriving international passengers, expanding the luggage-handling and sorting area for outbound flights, and expanding the Transportation Security Administration security checkpoint.

Airport managers initially anticipated that construction on the terminal expansion would begin in early 2021 and be operational before the summer 2022 travel season. However, due to the COVID-19 pandemic, the process was delayed and construction is now slated to begin in spring 2022 and be completed in December 2024. The air traffic control tower is also expected to be replaced by 2024 in a US$30 million project.

The airport's primary runway (11L/29R) is scheduled to be reconstructed between 2025 and 2027, a US$45 million project.

Airline service 

Many of the scheduled commercial flights to Fresno use smaller regional jet aircraft operated by regional airlines, and the airport is home to a significant operations base for SkyWest Airlines, the nation's largest regional airline. Fresno does still see mainline jet service on the busiest routes, and while only a few international flights operate to Mexico each day, they are some of the airport's most well patronized.

SkyWest carries between 50 and 60 percent of the passenger traffic at Fresno, with seasonal variability. The regional airline operates under contract with mainline partners as American Eagle, Alaska Airlines, Delta Connection and United Express. SkyWest has a 17-acre maintenance and overnight parking facility on the east side of the airfield with 21 aircraft positions, and an approximately 92,000 square foot hangar. SkyWest also uses Fresno as a crew base for pilots and flight attendants.

Additionally, Alaska Airlines, Allegiant Air, American Airlines, Southwest Airlines and United Airlines operate narrow-body aircraft from either the Airbus A320 family or the Boeing 737 family of jets.

Aeroméxico and Volaris both operate international service between Fresno and Guadalajara, Mexico's second-largest city and a major airline hub in the country. Additionally, Volaris also operates service to Morelia, the capital of and largest city in Mexico's Michoacán state and León, the largest city in Mexico's Guanajuato state. Direct international service from Fresno began on April 1, 2006, and are now some of the busiest flights from the airport. As of 2016, international service on Aeroméxico and Volaris accounted for about 6% of all flights to Fresno, but carried more than 13% of all passengers flying to the airport, a combined total of almost 201,000 people.

The carrier that has the longest continuous operation out of the Fresno Yosemite International Airport is United Airlines, which began serving the airport on its opening day, however some of the flights are operated by SkyWest.

Infrastructure

Airfield 

Aircraft 
In 2022, 2.1 million passengers passed through the Fresno Yosemite International Airport, representing an 11% increase from the previous record set in 2021, when 1.94 million passengers flew in and out of the airport, and breaking the record for most passengers, previously set in 2019.

For the year ending February 28, the airport had 92,361 aircraft operations, an average of 253 per day: 54% general aviation, 26% scheduled commercial, 11% air taxi and 8% military. At that time there were 187 aircraft based at the airport: 100 single-engine, 33 multi-engine, 24 military, 11 jet and 19 helicopter.

Airlines and destinations

Passenger

Cargo

Statistics

Airport traffic

Top destinations

Airline market share

Passenger traffic

Military and government operations 
The 144th Fighter Wing of the California Air National Guard is based out of the Fresno Yosemite International Airport. The California Army National Guard also has an Aviation Classification Repair Activity Depot (AVCRAD) at the airport. The depot performs high-level maintenance and repair of Army aircraft. Its jurisdiction covers a 15-state region in the Western United States.

The United States Forest Service, Sierra National Forest and the California Department of Forestry and Fire Protection (CAL FIRE) jointly operate the Fresno Air Attack Base at the airport for fighting forest fires with aerial tankers. The air attack base has a command center and four loading pits where fire retardant is pumped into aircraft with the capacity to load up to 300,000 gallons each day.

Other government operators with facilities at the airport include the California Highway Patrol (CHP), the Fresno County Sheriff's Office, and the Fresno Police Department.

Ground transportation and access

Highways 
California State Route 180 connects to all of the other freeways in the Fresno area: California State Route 41, California State Route 99, and California State Route 168. Yosemite National Park can be accessed by California State Route 41 and Kings Canyon National Park and Sequoia National Park can be accessed by California State Route 180.

Parking 
The city of Fresno offers paid on-site parking in a 900 space parking garage south of the airport terminal, a large lot south of the terminal, and several smaller lots east of the terminal. A separate cell phone waiting lot located on the southeast corner of the airport property has stalls, designated for drivers waiting for arriving passengers.

Public transportation 
Fresno Area Express (FAX) operates two public transit bus routes to the airport, each with half-hourly service. Route 26 Palm / Butler runs between the airport and North Fresno via Southeast and Downtown Fresno (where passengers may transfer to other FAX routes). Route 39 FYI/Clinton runs between the airport and West Fresno.

The City of Visalia operates the V-LINE bus between the airport and the Visalia Transit Center (where passengers can connect to Visalia Transit routes) and the Visalia Airport (which offers V-LINE passengers free long-term parking for up to ten days).

Rental car facility 
The airport offers a consolidated rental car facility at the west end of the terminal. Nine rental car companies have passenger service counters inside the terminal near the baggage claim area and up to 400 cars can be parked in a lot just west of the terminal building. The 11-acre rental car facility opened in 2009 and was built at a cost of US$22 million.

Bicycle 
The airport has covered bicycle parking racks located inside the parking garage south of the airport terminal. Nearby roads East Clinton Way, East McKinley Avenue are designated as Class II bike lanes and they connect to the Class I bike path that runs parallel to North Clovis Avenue.

Accidents and incidents 
 On December 14, 1994, a private jet on a military training mission, attempting to land at Fresno, crashed onto a street and skidded into an apartment complex, killing both pilots and injuring 21 people on the ground. The Learjet 35, piloted by two civilians and belonging to a Georgia-based company, Phoenix Air Group, was contracted by the US Air Force to provide training for California Air National Guard pilots. The plane had been involved in a war game with an F-16 fighter jet and was on its way back to the airport when the flight crew declared an emergency due to engine fire indications. They directed the plane toward their requested runway but the aircraft continued past the airport. It then plowed into an apartment complex and exploded in a fireball. Twelve apartment units in two buildings were destroyed or substantially damaged by the impact or the subsequent fire. The National Transportation Safety Board determined that the probable causes of the accident were improperly installed electrical wiring that led to an in-flight fire which damaged the aircraft's systems causing a loss of control and improper maintenance and inspection of the aircraft.
 On September 13, 2015, a McDonnell Douglas MD-87 jetliner converted for aerial firefighting use as an air tanker operated by Erickson Aero Tanker had an engine failure after taking off from the airport. Pieces of the engine struck a car, damaging it. The aircraft was able to return to the airport safely.

References

External links 

 
 
 

Airports in Fresno County, California
Transportation in Fresno, California
Public transportation in the San Joaquin Valley Area
California in World War II